MIDAL (Mitte-Deutschland-Anbindungsleitung) is a  long German natural gas pipeline, which connects the North Sea with southern Germany.  It runs from Bunde, where it is connected with Netherlands gas system, and Emdel receiving terminal, to Ludwigshafen.  The pipeline has a capacity of 12.8 billion cubic meters of natural gas per year.  It was constructed in 1992–1993, and it is owned and operated by Wingas GmbH & Co. KG.

In Rehden, the pipeline is connected with the Rehden gas storage. Also the Rehden–Hamburg gas pipeline branches-off from MIDAL. In future, MIDAL will be connected with the NEL pipeline at Reheden.

The middle section with length of  connects Rehden with Reckrod. In Bad Salzuflen, the WEDAL pipeline towards Belgium branches-off from MIDAL. In Reckrod, MIDAL is connected with the STEGAL pipeline.

MIDAL-ERM was commissioned in April 1964.

See also

 STEGAL
 JAGAL
 Rehden-Hamburg gas pipeline
 NEL pipeline

References

External links
 MIDAL (Wingas website)

Energy infrastructure completed in 1993
Natural gas pipelines in Germany